Vinod Kapoor   is an Indian actor who works in Hindi cinema and TV serials. He played the role of Dushasana in the Indian TV serial Mahabharat and essayed the role of Vibhishana in the TV serial Vishnu Puran and Ramayan.

Early life and career
Vinod Kapoor first appeared in Yeh Pyar Nahin, the 1988 Salim Khan and Huma Khan starrer. The movie by itself is little known. It was his second project for which he is most well known. He played the role of Dushasana in BR Chopra's Mahabharat. After this he had a fairly steady job in TV serials, most notably BR Chopra's Kanoon in which he played the role of Inspector Shakti Singh, appearing in a good number of episodes. Kapoor is also known for his essaying of the role of Vibhishana in the 2008 TV series Ramayan by Sagar Arts as well as in the 2000 TV series Vishnu Puran.

Filmography

Films

Television

References

External links
 
 Vinod Kapoor on YouTube

Living people
Indian male actors
Indian male television actors
Male actors in Hindi cinema
Year of birth missing (living people)
21st-century Indian actors